Pereira v. United States, 347 U.S. 1 (1954), was a United States Supreme Court case in which the Court held that the word "knowingly" in the federal mail fraud statute, 18 U.S.C. § 1341, should extend to all reasonably foreseeable consequences, even ones not specifically intended.

References

External links
 

United States Supreme Court cases
United States Supreme Court cases of the Warren Court
1954 in United States case law
Mail and wire fraud case law